Paulo Cesar Rodriguez, best known as Paulinho (born June 10, 1981 in Brazil) is a Brazilian football right winger, currently playing for C.D. Aspirante of El Salvador.

External links
 brujasfc.com
 CBF 
 Paulo César Rodrigues Lima at BDFA.com.ar 

1981 births
Living people
Association football midfielders
Brazilian footballers
Brazilian expatriate footballers
Marília Atlético Clube players
Paraná Clube players
San Salvador F.C. footballers
C.D. Luis Ángel Firpo footballers
Once Municipal footballers
Brujas FC players
C.D. FAS footballers
C.D. Juventud Independiente players
Expatriate footballers in El Salvador
Expatriate footballers in Costa Rica